Navroʻz is an urban-type settlement in Sirdaryo Region, Uzbekistan. It is the administrative center of Mirzaabad District. Its population was 2,166 people in 1989, and 2,200 in 2016.

References

Populated places in Sirdaryo Region
Urban-type settlements in Uzbekistan